90 Minutes: Sega Championship Football is a football video game developed by Smilebit for the Dreamcast. In Japan it was released as J.League Spectacle Soccer (Jリーグ スペクタクルサッカー), tying it in with the Japanese J.League. It features full field action, as well as sim elements such as the ability to make an all-star team.

Gameplay
Players have the freedom to select from over 32 national teams, as well as club teams from major leagues across Europe and around the world. There is a choice of club teams from the English, French, German, Italian and Spanish leagues. Players may challenge for the World Championship (based on the World Cup) or compete for title glory in a Domestic League competition.

The game also features in-game commentary from British television and radio commentator Alan Parry.

References

Further reading
 Review on JeuxVideo.com 

2001 video games
Association football video games
Dreamcast games
Dreamcast-only games
Europe-exclusive video games
Sega video games
Smilebit games
Multiplayer and single-player video games
Video games developed in Japan